Ted Schmitz is a gridiron football executive, coach, and broadcaster who currently serves as the Director of Player Personnel of the Indoor Football League's Bloomington Extreme.

Schmitz joined the Extreme in 2005 as the team's head coach. In 2008, he moved to the front office as Director of Player Personnel, but also assumed the role of Defensive Coordinator. In 2010, he returned to the head coaching position after the Extreme got off to a 3-5 under Kenton Carr. Bloomington went 6-0 under Schmitz and made the IFL playoffs.

Prior to joining the Extreme, Schmitz was an assistant at Eastern Illinois, Augustana College, Illinois State and Illinois Wesleyan and was the radio color commentator on ISU football broadcasts. Schmitz also spent eight seasons as a defensive assistant with the Hamilton Tiger-Cats and served as the interim head coach for six games during the 1987 season after head coach Al Bruno suffered a mild heart attack.

Coaching record

References

Living people
Hamilton Tiger-Cats coaches
Indoor Football League coaches
Canadian Football League scouts
Year of birth missing (living people)